Yana Muqu, or Yana Mokho (Quechua yana "black" + muqu "hill", "black hill"), is a  mountain in the Andes of Bolivia. It is located in the Potosí Department, Nor Chichas Province, Cotagaita Municipality.

References 

Mountains of Potosí Department